"Still Young" is a song by Swedish singer Charlotte Perrelli. It was performed in Melodifestivalen 2021 and made it to the 13 March final. "Still Young" became Perrelli's eighth top-40 single in Sweden.

Charts

References

2021 songs
2021 singles
Charlotte Perrelli songs
Melodifestivalen songs of 2021
Songs written by Bobby Ljunggren
Songs written by Thomas G:son